Friends of Nature (international abbreviation: NFI, for German: Naturfreunde International) is a non-profit organisation with a background in the social democratic movement, which aims to make the enjoyment of nature accessible to the wider community by providing appropriate recreational and travel facilities. It encourages sustainable tourism and international friendship.

It is also known as Naturfreunde (German), Les Amis de la Nature (French), Amici della Natura (Italian), La Naturamikoj (Esperanto), and Natuurvrienden or NIVON (Dutch).

Background
The International Friends of Nature (IFN), based in Vienna, is the umbrella organisation of the national Friends of Nature federations.

Publications of the various sections include a handbook detailing all the houses and magazines published by various sections (such as Naturefriends - Great Britain - Bulletin, Les Amis de La Nature, La Migranto – in Esperanto by "Esperantistoj Naturamikoj" etc.).

Tradition
The Friends of Nature organisation was founded in Vienna in 1895.The group was founded by three activists, Karl Renner, a law student and future President of Austria, Georg Schmiedl, a schoolteacher, and Alois Rohrauer, a blacksmith. In the age of incipient tourism, the organisation succeeded in making nature accessible to broader population strata by providing requisite recreational and travel facilities.

The organisation was banned by the Nazis in 1933, but revived in 1945.

Commitment to sustainable development
International environmental campaigns, such as "100,000 Trees for Europe" or "Blue Rivers for Europe" are intended to enhance environmental awareness in Europe and to offer members opportunities to take action in the interest of the environment. In 1995, the Friends of Nature set up the "Institute for Integrative Tourism". The "Manifesto for a New Europe" (1993) and the "Manifesto for a Social, Ecological and Peaceful Future" (1996) proposals submitted to the Inter-governmental Conference of the European Union, and the "Green Paper - The Alps" are examples of international lobbying by the Friends of Nature.

Friends of Nature worldwide
With 350,000 members organised in approximately 45 member organisations, the Friends of Nature are among the biggest non-profit and non-governmental organisations worldwide. They provide environmentally sound travel programmes for their members and run over 700 Nature Friends Houses mainly in Europe. The houses vary in size and facilities.

International Young Nature friends
In the 1970s, a group of young members of four Nature friends' organisations (Germany, Austria, Switzerland and the Netherlands) created a youth umbrella to network and support youth work in the movement. The organisation was formalised and has extended to current 26 member and partner organisations. The organisation was officially funded in 1975 with the first Secretary General Jochem Zimmer from Germany.

The International Young Nature friends (IYNF) cooperated and were supported by the Council of Europe's Directorate Youth and Sport. In 2002, after more than ten years of seating in Brussels, the office of IYNF was moved to Prague, Czech Republic where the Secretariat of IYNF is currently located.

IYNF is a founding member of the European Youth Forum where Young Nature friends belonged to the socialist family or the family of non-formal education organisations.

International Young Nature friends provides trainings and international activities to the members of its network on different topics every year. They are also active in international conference such as the COP of the UNFCCC, actively lobbying for the interests of the young people of both Europe and beyond, concerned with environmental issues, social justice and the climatic change.

References

External links
 International Friends of Nature
 Friends of Nature Germany (NaturFreunde Deutschlands)
 Great Britain branch
 Swiss branch
 NIVON - Dutch branch
 Geneva-specific branch
 International Young Naturefriends
 San Francisco Nature Friends
 Oakland Nature Friends
 Los Angeles Nature Friends
 Italian Nature Friends (G.I.A.N.)

International environmental organizations
International sustainability organizations
International organisations based in Vienna